Stefano Bemer (1964–2012) was an Italian shoemaker, based in Florence. Bemer's clients included the actor Andy Garcia, designer Gianfranco Ferré and singer Julio Iglesias.

The actor Sir Daniel Day-Lewis  worked as an apprentice for Bemer for eight months between 1999 and 2000, showing up for work at 8am every day. Bemer’s website states, “What many do not know is what brought them together: perfectionism. DD Lewis and Stefano shared the same passion for their respective forms of art.” The London shoe designer Justin FitzPatrick also did an apprenticeship with the shoemaker in 2008–2009. His handmade shoes are highly prized.

Nowadays, the company is carried on by Tommaso Melani and his Scuola del Cuoio family company. Stefano Bemer is now a large artisanal workshop nested in a chapel in Via San Niccoló in Florence and has a direct showroom in New York City.

References

External links
Official website
Forbes article

Italian brands
Luxury brands
Shoe companies of Italy
Shoe brands
Shoemakers
1964 births
2012 deaths